The Don is a river in Russia and the fifth-longest river in Europe.

Don River or River Don may also refer to:

Australia
Don River (Central Queensland), a tributary of the Fitzroy River
Don River (North Queensland)
Don River (Tasmania)
Don River (Victoria)

Canada
Don River (Ontario)

France
Don (Vilaine), a river in Brittany

United Kingdom
River Don, Lancashire, England
River Don, Tyne and Wear, England
River Don, Yorkshire, England
Little Don River, a tributary
River Don Navigation, the lower River Don
Duke of Northumberland's River or D.O.N. River
River Don, Aberdeenshire, Scotland

See also

 
 
 Don (disambiguation)
 Don River Bridge (disambiguation)
 Don Rivers, American politician